Wimahl is a genus of cetacean that belongs to the family Kentriodontidae. It lived in the Miocene period. It contains a single species, Wimahl chinookensis. The name Wimahl translates to "big river" in the local Chinook language.

Discovery
There is one known specimen. It includes a complete skull, some vertebrae, and parts of both flippers, and is labelled as UWBM 88078. It was found in 2003 near the north bank of the Columbia River, in the state of Washington.

References

Prehistoric toothed whales